The Fruitties is an animated television series produced in Spain by D'Ocon Film Productions in 1989., created by Antoni D'Ocon and written by Josep Viciana. It originally aired on the Spanish television channel TVE Originally, 91 episodes were created – each 25 minutes long – but the series was often repackaged as 52 episodes.
The series was dubbed into many languages and, in 1991, an English-language version of the show made its debut on British television.

Story
The show features the adventures of anthropomorphic talking fruit, vegetables and various other plants who live in and around a forest island near a volcano. One day, the supposedly extinct volcano the Fruitties live around shows signs of erupting, thus forcing the Fruitties to send three explorers, the show's main characters Roly, Pak, and Thorny, to find them a new home.

Characters
Roly is a pineapple with a southern Spanish accent. He tends to brag and get the entire team in trouble. However, he is shown to be resourceful when he needs to be. He is also known as Gazpacho in the Spanish version.
Pak is a knowledgeable banana and carries a backpack which contains an array of handy survival equipment for the team. He tends to bicker with Roly, due to Roly's laziness and bragging nature, yet he admires his sense of humor and his resourcefulness. He also has a rivalry with Monkus, the mad scientist monkey, who, unlike Pak, uses his scientific skills for evil. He is also known as Mochillo in the Spanish version.
Thorny is a dim-witted cactus, speaking with a southern US accent. His prickly body saves the group from dangerous creatures on many occasions, although it is a pain in the neck to Roly. He is also known as Pincho in the Spanish version.
Kumba is the only female and human in the group. She joins Roly, Pak and Thorny to guide them around the world. She sports a bikini made of leaves. In some episodes she tries to meet her parents and older brother, Luke.
Mayor Strawberry is the mayor of the Fruitties' village. He is very strict and no-nonsense, caring and reasonable.
Monkus is the main antagonist of the series and the Fruitties' arch-nemesis. He is a mad scientist monkey who seeks to conquer the world and impose his own rules. Unfortunately for him, his plans are always thwarted by the Fruitties. He is known as Monus in the Spanish version.
Bruce is a gorilla and Monkus' henchman who tries to help him to conquer the world. He is also known as Gluttonus.
Boss is a wild boar who speaks with a Bronx-style accent and is determined to capture and eat the Fruitties but always ends up failing.
Brute is a wild boar who helps Boss to capture and eat the Fruitties even though he always fails. He is also known as Issac or Barry in some episodes.
Thistle is a prankster who loves to pull pranks on the others.
Artichoke the Pirate (or Pirate Artichoko) is a pirate who was an enemy of the main characters at first, but later befriended them.

Song
The show is fondly remembered for its songs featured during both its opening and closing credits sequences. 

In late 2014, a downloadable CD was released on iTunes. Though it does not include all the major instrumental tracks used in the show, such as Monkus's theme, it does contain all the major vocal tracks from the series and they are issued in two languages, both Spanish and English. The following URL hosts the CD:

https://itunes.apple.com/us/artist/docon-singers/id906798318

Track List Spanish Album ITunes Release (Fruittis):

1) Intro de Los Fruittis

2) El Bosque de los Fruittis

3) Gazpacho el Campeón

4) Safari Fotográfico

5) El Pirata Alcachofo

6) Viva el Sol

7) Vaya Trio

8) Canción del Agua

9) Canción del Ahorro

10) Viva la Nieve

11) Viajando en Globo

12) Kumba

Track List UK Album ITunes Release (Fruitties):

1) The Fruitties Theme Song (Original Version)

2) The Fruitties' Forest (Original Version)

3) Roly, The Champion (Original Version)

4) Picture Taking (Original Version)

5) Artichoke, the Pirate (Original Version)

6) Tuttie Fruttie (Original Version)

7) Trio (Original Version)

8) Water (Original Version)

9) Saving (Original Version)

10) Live (Original Version)

11) Ballooning (Original Version)

12) Kumba (Original Version)

TV Series Episodes

 The Fruitties' Volcano
 The Enigma of the Giants
 The Floating Bottle
 Turtle Swamp
 The Flower Rebellion
 Voyage to Canada
 Terror Mountain
 Springtime Fever
 Journey to China
 The Fruittilympics
 The Fruitties in America
 Baby Wolf
 Prankster Thistle
 Airborne Adventures
 Voyage to Mexico
 The Smart Little Duck
 The Magical Lamp
 A Scary Night
 An Ice Island
 Voyage to Paris
 The Magical Feathers
 Lost in the Arctic
 Eastward Bound
 The Thief of Paris
 The Flower Thief
 The Rain of Dissension
 The Marine Ghost
 The Painting Contest
 Arizona Fruitty
 The Mermaid's Singing
 The Forest In Flames
 Rigoletto's Book
 One Quiet Day
 The Rugby Match
 The Seafaring Adventures
 Operation Rescue
 The Wild Boar Jinx
 Searching for Thistle
 The Dickpea from Outer Space
 Journey to the Himalayas
 The Wicked Wizard
 The Floating Island
 The Mountain of the Spirits
 The Mysterious Drought
 The Great Pyramid
 The Endangered Jungle
 Vocationing in the Canaries
 Thorny’s Birthday
 The Conceited King
 The Magic Frog
 Cactus Desert
 Polar Adventure

DVD
A DVD of the Spanish version was issued in 2006.
A DVD of the English version has yet to be released; however, the Spanish DVDs of the show have optional English audio tracks.
In Bulgaria the entire series was released by A-Design over 9 discs. The DVDs feature Bulgarian audio track only that is newly produced and is different from the dub from the show's original airing in the 90s.

External links
http://www.docon.es/
http://www.docon.es/fruittis/inicio.htm
http://www.planete-jeunesse.com/sources/series.php3?cle=1385
https://www.youtube.com/watch?v=YtJi1tw7fGk
http://www.imdb.com/title/tt0856136/
http://www.zonadvd.com/modules.php?name=News&file=article&sid=7342

References

Spanish children's animated comedy television series
RTVE shows
1989 Spanish television series debuts
1992 Spanish television series endings
1980s Spanish television series
1990s Spanish television series
Fruit and vegetable characters
English-language television shows